Estonian Sports Team of the Year is chosen annually each December, since 1969.

The winner is voted by a group of sports journalists, public, and sports associations.

List of award winners

See also
 Estonian Sports Personality of the Year
 Estonian Young Sports Personality of the Year
 Estonian Coach of the Year

External links
 Official website

Estonian sports trophies and awards
Sports trophies and awards
Awards established in 1969
1969 establishments in Estonia